Events in the year 1986 in Belgium.

Incumbents
 Monarch: Baudouin
 Prime Minister: Wilfried Martens

Events
January
 1 January – Breakout of 14 inmates from Arlon prison.
 25 January – About 3,000 gendarmes demonstrate in Brussels for better working conditions.

February
 5 February – Publication of a report into working practices in the Belgian postal service reveals massive inefficiency.

March
 17 March – Albert Houssiau appointed bishop of Liège by Pope John Paul II

April
 12 April – About 20,000 march in Hasselt to demand that Limburg's mines be kept open.
 15 April – Prime Minister Wilfried Martens and Deputy Prime Minister Guy Verhofstadt lay the first stone of the Flanders Expo convention centre in Ghent.
 29 April – R.W.D. Molenbeek football club goes into receivership.

May
 3 May – Sandra Kim wins the Eurovision Song Contest 1986 singing "J'aime la vie".
 18 May – Albert Houssiau consecrated bishop of Liège
 29 May – The Flag of Europe first flown in front of the Commission of the European Communities in Brussels.
 30 May – About 50,000 protest against government austerity measures in a demonstration organised by the General Federation of Belgian Labour.

June
 25 June – Former prime minister Paul Vanden Boeynants convicted of fraud.
 30 June – Massive public celebration of the return of the Belgium national football team after placing fourth in the 1986 FIFA World Cup in Mexico.

October
 12 October – Renovated La Monnaie opera house reopens with a performance of Beethoven's Ninth Symphony.
 18 October – Interior Minister Charles-Ferdinand Nothomb resigns in protest over the government's stance on the language struggle in Voeren.
 26 October – German-speaking Community Council election

November
 14 November – Hugo Claus receives the Prijs der Nederlandse Letteren for The Sorrow of Belgium.

December
 12 December – A bank robber shot by police in Anderlecht turns out to be a policeman himself.

Publications
Reference series
 Biographie Nationale de Belgique, vol. 44 (supplement 16).
 OECD, Economic Surveys, 1985/1986: Belgium, Luxembourg

Books
 Jonathan E. Helmreich, Gathering Rare Ores: The Diplomacy of Uranium Acquisition, 1943–1954 (Princeton University Press)

Art and architecture
Films
 Chantal Akerman (dir.), Golden Eighties

Births
 13 February – Sylvie De Caluwé, model
 21 February – Prince Amedeo of Belgium, Archduke of Austria-Este
 13 March – Ludovic Buysens, footballer
 20 April – Onur Kaya, footballer
 1 August – Michaël Van Geele, footballer
 22 October – Murat Akın, footballer
 3 December – Annelien Coorevits, beauty queen

Deaths
 7 February – Armand Preud'homme, composer
 3 April – Charles Moeller, scholar
 2 June – Daniel Sternefeld, conductor
 6 July – Flor Peeters, organist
 23 August – Charles Janssens, actor
 5 October – Jozef van Overstraeten, founder of the Flemish automobile association
 16 October – Arthur Grumiaux, violinist
 16 December – Marcel Quinet, composer
 27 December – Louis Van Lint, painter
 28 December – Karel Aerts, director of the BRT

References

 
1980s in Belgium
20th century in Belgium
Events in Belgium
Deaths in Belgium